Nikola Vuković (born 5 October 1996) is a Serbian football forward who last played for FK Vršac.

Career

Metalac Gornji Milanovac
Born in Gornji Milanovac, Vuković passed the youth school of Metalac Gornji Milanovac, and was a member of generation which made promotion to the best level Serbian youth league in 2014. He made his debut for first team in the last fixture of 2014–15 Serbian First League season, against Radnik Surdulica. Vuković was loaned to Karađorđe Topola for the first half of 2015–16 season. He made his first Serbian SuperLiga appearance for Metalac in the 19th fixture of 2015–16 season, in away match against Radnički Niš. In summer 2016, Vuković terminated his scholarship contract with club.

Career statistics

Notes

References

External links
 Nikola Vuković stats at utakmica.rs 
 

1996 births
Living people
People from Gornji Milanovac
Association football forwards
Serbian footballers
FK Metalac Gornji Milanovac players
FK Karađorđe Topola players
Serbian First League players
Serbian SuperLiga players